Douglas Creek flows into the Black River near Greig, New York.

References 

Rivers of Lewis County, New York